Lakhshi Bolo (formerly Muqsu) is a jamoat in Tajikistan. It is located in Lakhsh District, one of the Districts of Republican Subordination. The jamoat has a total population of 10,501 (2015). It consists of 7 villages, including Lakhsh (the seat), Mugh, Zarrinrud, Samarmand, Chashmasor, Shirinob and Chorgul.

References

Populated places in Districts of Republican Subordination
Jamoats of Tajikistan